Monardella is a genus of approximately 40 species of annual and perennial plants native to western North America from British Columbia to northwestern Mexico. They are grown for their highly aromatic foliage, which in some species is used for herbal teas. The two-lipped, tubular flowers are formed in terminal clusters and are most usually red, pink, or purple.

Monardella is a taxonomic patronym honoring the Spanish botanist Nicolás Monardes. Plants in this genus are commonly known as wildmints, coyote mints or monardellas.

Systematics
The genus comprises the following species.
 Monardella antonina Hardham - California
 Monardella arizonica Epling - Arizona
 Monardella australis Abrams - southern California
 Monardella beneolens Shevock, Ertter & Jokerst - southern California
 Monardella boydii A.C.Sanders & Elvin - southern California
 Monardella breweri A.Gray - California, Nevada, Arizona, Baja California
 Monardella candicans Benth. - San Joaquín Valley of California
 Monardella douglasii Benth. - San Francisco Bay area of California
 Monardella eplingii Elvin et al. - Arizona
 Monardella eremicola A.C.Sanders & Elvin - southern California
 Monardella exilis (A.Gray) Greene - southern California, Arizona
 Monardella follettii (Jeps.) Jokerst - northern Sierra Nevada in California
 Monardella frutescens (Hoover) Jokerst - California
 Monardella hypoleuca A.Gray - southern California, Baja California
 Monardella lagunensis M.E.Jones - Baja California Sur
 Monardella lanceolata A.Gray - California
 †Monardella leucocephala A.Gray - Merced & Stanislaus counties in California but believed to be extinct
 Monardella linoides A.Gray - California, Arizona, Nevada, Baja California
 Monardella macrantha A.Gray - California, Baja California
 Monardella mojavensis Elvin & A.C.Sanders - Mohave Desert of southeastern California & southern Nevada
 Monardella nana A.Gray - California, Baja California
 Monardella odoratissima Benth. - mountain wildmint, mountain coyote mint or mountain pennyroyal - much of western North America from British Columbia south to southern California & New Mexico
 Monardella palmeri A.Gray - Santa Lucia Mountains of west-central California
 †Monardella pringlei A.Gray - Mohave Desert of southeastern California but believed to be extinct
 Monardella purpurea Howell - Oregon, California
 Monardella robisonii Epling ex Munz - Mohave Desert of southeastern California 
 Monardella saxicola I.M.Johnst. - southeastern California 
 Monardella sheltonii Torr. ex Durand - Oregon, California
 Monardella sinuata Elvin & A.C.Sanders - coastal central California
 Monardella siskiyouensis Hardham - northern California
 Monardella stebbinsii Hardham & Bartel - Plumas County in northern California
 Monardella stoneana Elvin & A.C.Sanders - San Diego County in California, Baja California
 Monardella × subglabra (Hoover) Hardham - California (M. purpurea × M. villosa)
 Monardella thymifolia Greene - Cedros Island in Baja California
 Monardella undulata Benth. - coastal central California
 Monardella venosa (Torr.) A.C.Sanders & Elvin - central California
 Monardella villosa Benth. - (common) coyote mint - Oregon, California
 Monardella viminea Greene - San Diego County in southern California
 Monardella viridis Jeps. - northern San Francisco Bay area of California (Sonoma, Napa, Solano, & Lake Counties)

Horticulture and ecology
Most like a sunny, sharply drained site and can be attractive in a rock garden or pot in the alpine house if smaller species are selected. The taller ones can be used at the front of a dry sunny border. They have reasonable frost resistance, but resent dampness in winter. Propagate from seed or summer cuttings of perennial species, or by division of clumps.

Monardella is a nectar plant for many Lepidoptera (butterflies and moths), including the endangered Myrtle's silverspot (Speyeria zerene myrtleae).

Several species are rare California endemics; two, the Merced monardella (M. leucocephala) and Pringle's monardella (M. pringlei), have not been seen in many decades and are presumed extinct.

Notes

References

External links

 USDA Plants Profile: Monardella
 Calflora Database: Monardella

 
Lamiaceae genera
Flora of North America
Taxa named by Carl Linnaeus